Arnuff Ueland, Jr. (June 21, 1920 – July 15, 2004) was an American businessman and politician.

Ueland was born in Saint Paul, Minnesota and graduated from West High School in Minneapolis, Minnesota. He went to Dartmouth College and received his bachelor's degree in political science from University of Minnesota in 1943. Ueland served in the United States Navy during World War II. Ueland lived in North Mankato, Minnesota with his wife and family. He owned the Ueland Lumber Sales Company. Ueland served in the Minnesota Senate from 1973 to 1980. He was a Republican. He died at St. Joseph's Hospital in Mankato, Minnesota.

Notes

1920 births
2004 deaths
Politicians from Saint Paul, Minnesota
People from North Mankato, Minnesota
Military personnel from Minnesota
Businesspeople from Saint Paul, Minnesota
Dartmouth College alumni
University of Minnesota College of Liberal Arts alumni
Republican Party Minnesota state senators
United States Navy personnel of World War II